John William Miles (21 June 1817 – 5 November 1878) was a British Conservative politician and briefly MP.

Miles was elected MP for Bristol at a by-election in April 1868. His election was soon declared void on 25 June 1868 due to "bribery and personation" and the findings saw the writ for the seat suspended until November. At the ensuing general election, Miles again stood for parliament but was unsuccessful.

Miles was the third son of former Bristol MP Philip Jones Miles and was educated at both Eton College and Oxford University. During his life, he was also a Justice of the Peace and Deputy Lieutenant of Herefordshire. He died unmarried in 1878.

References

External links
 

1817 births
1878 deaths
Deputy Lieutenants of Herefordshire
UK MPs 1865–1868
Conservative Party (UK) MPs for English constituencies
People educated at Eton College
Alumni of the University of Oxford